Bobby is a 2006 American drama film written and directed by Emilio Estevez, and starring an ensemble cast featuring Harry Belafonte, Joy Bryant, Nick Cannon, Laurence Fishburne, Spencer Garrett, Helen Hunt, Joshua Jackson, Anthony Hopkins, Ashton Kutcher, Shia LaBeouf, Lindsay Lohan, William H. Macy, Demi Moore, Martin Sheen, Christian Slater, Sharon Stone, Freddy Rodriguez, Heather Graham, Elijah Wood and Estevez himself. The screenplay is a fictionalized account of the hours leading up to the June 5, 1968, shooting of U.S. Senator Robert F. Kennedy in the kitchen of the Ambassador Hotel in Los Angeles following his win of the 1968 Democratic presidential primary in California.

Plot synopsis
The film recreates the ambiance of the era and invokes the hopes inspired by Kennedy through the use of actual broadcast and newsfilm footage of the senator intercut with dramatic sequences involving mostly fictional characters. It uses an ensemble plot device similar to that employed in the 1932 film Grand Hotel, and by Robert Altman in Nashville.

The characters include John Casey, a retired hotel doorman who spends his days in the lobby playing chess with his friend Nelson; Diane, who is marrying her friend William with the hope his marital status will have him deployed to a military base in Germany rather than the battlefields of Vietnam when his tour of duty begins; Virginia Fallon, an alcoholic singer whose career is on the downswing, her put-upon husband/manager Tim, and her agent Phil; Miriam Ebbers, a beautician who works in the hotel salon, and her husband Paul, the hotel manager, who is having an affair with switchboard operator Angela; food and beverage manager Daryl Timmons, whose racist attitude gets him fired; African American sous chef Edward Robinson and Mexican American busboys José and Miguel; hotel coffee shop waitress Susan; Jimmy and Cooper, campaign volunteers who are sidetracked by an acid trip they take with the help of drug dealer Fisher; married socialites and campaign donors Samantha and Jack; campaign manager Wade and staffer Dwayne, who is in love with Angela's colleague, Patricia; and Czechoslovakian reporter Lenka Janáčková, who is determined to get an interview with Kennedy.

At the end of the film, Kennedy is shot after giving his acceptance speech. A man named Sirhan Sirhan would be convicted of the killing. After being shot, Kennedy is cradled and protected by Jose until help arrives. As Kennedy's speech "On the Mindless Menace of Violence", delivered in 1968 to the City Club of Cleveland, Ohio, is played over the aftermath, it is revealed that Samantha, Daryl, Cooper, Jimmy and William are among those injured by Sirhan's wild firing. Sirhan is apprehended, while Kennedy is rushed into an ambulance (as are the others eventually), and everyone else is moved by the events that have just taken place. Closing titles reveal that Kennedy died of his injuries the following morning with his wife Ethel at his side, and the other victims of the shooting survived.

Cast

 Harry Belafonte as Nelson
 Joy Bryant as Patricia
 Nick Cannon as Dwayne Clark
 Emilio Estevez as Tim Fallon
 Laurence Fishburne as Edward Robinson
 Dave Fraunces as Robert F. Kennedy
 Jeridan Frye as Ethel Kennedy
 Spencer Garrett as David
 Brian Geraghty as Jimmy
 Heather Graham as Angela
 Anthony Hopkins as John Casey
 Helen Hunt as Samantha Stevens
 Joshua Jackson as Wade Buckley
 David Kobzantsev as Sirhan Sirhan
 David Krumholtz as Agent Phil
 Ashton Kutcher as Fisher
 Shia LaBeouf as Cooper
 Lindsay Lohan as Diane Howser
 William H. Macy as Paul Ebbers
 Svetlana Metkina as Lenka
 Demi Moore as Virginia Fallon
 Freddy Rodriguez as José Rojas
 Martin Sheen as Jack
 Christian Slater as Daryl Timmons
 Sharon Stone as Miriam Ebbers
 Jacob Vargas as Miguel
 Mary Elizabeth Winstead as Susan Taylor
 Elijah Wood as William Avary

Production

Development
In Bobby: The Making of an American Epic, screenwriter/director Emilio Estevez discusses the problems he had developing his script. Suffering from writer's block, he checked into a motel in Pismo Beach where he hoped, free from interruption, he could make some headway with his writing. While talking to the woman working at the front desk, he discovered she had been in the Ambassador Hotel on the evening Kennedy was shot, and later married two young men to help them avoid the draft. Estevez used her experience to mold the character of Diane, and the rest of the story fell into place.

The five other characters "shot" in the assassination scene do not coincide with the five actual victims—William Weisel of ABC News, Paul Schrade of the United Auto Workers union, Democratic Party activist Elizabeth Evans, Ira Goldstein of the Continental News Service and 17-year-old Kennedy campaign volunteer Irwin Stroll. The only other character based on a real person is busboy José, who represents Juan Romero, the young man who was photographed cradling Kennedy's body immediately after he was shot. The character of José has tickets to the Los Angeles Dodgers game in which Don Drysdale is expected to set the record of six consecutive shutouts, but is obliged to work a double shift, forcing him to miss the game. Drysdale did in fact achieve his sixth shutout on June 4, 1968, and was congratulated by Kennedy during the victory speech he delivered just before being shot.

Music
The film score was composed by Mark Isham, with "Never Gonna Break My Faith" written by Bryan Adams and performed by Aretha Franklin, Mary J. Blige, and the Boys Choir of Harlem, which was played during the closing credits. Also, a newly recorded version of "Louie Louie" was performed in character by Demi Moore for the film.

Songs heard throughout the film consist of a music compilation from the 1960s, including "The Tracks of My Tears" by Smokey Robinson, "I Was Made to Love Her" by Stevie Wonder, "Ain't That Peculiar" by Marvin Gaye, an original acoustic version of "The Sound of Silence" by Simon & Garfunkel, "Anji" covered by Jason Huxley, "Come See About Me" by The Supremes, "There's a Kind of Hush" by Herman's Hermits, "Black Is Black" by Los Bravos, "Season of the Witch" and "Hurdy Gurdy Man" by Donovan, "Wives and Lovers" by Jack Jones, "Magic Moments" by Perry Como, "Pata Pata" by Miriam Makeba and "Initials" from the musical Hair.

The soundtrack album Bobby features The Supremes, Shorty Long, Hugh Masekela, The Moody Blues and Los Bravos.

Release

After an initial premiere at the NUIG Student Cinema at the National University of Ireland, Galway, the film premiered at the Venice Film Festival and was shown at the Deauville Film Festival, the 2006 Toronto International Film Festival, the Vienna International Film Festival, the London Film Festival, and AFI Fest before going into limited release in the US on November 17, 2006, and a wide release in the subsequent week. Playing on two screens, it grossed $69,039 during its opening weekend. It eventually earned $11,242,801 in North America and $9,461,790 in other territories for a worldwide box office of $20,704,591.

Reception
, Bobby has an approval rating of 46% on Rotten Tomatoes based on 176 reviews, with an average score of 5.6/10. The consensus states, "Despite best intentions from director Emilio Estevez and his ensemble cast, they succumb to a script filled with pointless subplots and awkward moments working too hard to parallel contemporary times." The film also has a score of 54 out of 100 on Metacritic, based on 31 critics, indicating mixed or average reviews. Audiences polled by CinemaScore gave the film an average score of "B+" on an A+ to F scale.

A. O. Scott of The New York Times wrote that despite the director's "large and honorable task" and "entirely admirable" intentions, "The actors seem more like 'very special guest stars' than like real, 1968-vintage Americans ... Some of the stories feel too obviously melodramatic, while others are vague to the point of inscrutability. In the Vietnam- and drug-related plots, the point is hammered home too hard ... while other narratives wind toward no discernible point at all. Nonetheless the ambition behind Bobby is large and serious."

Kevin Crust of the Los Angeles Times called it "an ambitious film drenched in sincerity and oozing with nostalgia that, despite the energy provided by its title icon via archival footage, falls flat dramatically in nearly every other way. It aspires for the Altmanesque interplay of Nashville or Short Cuts but instead feels like one of those '70s disaster epics such as Earthquake or The Towering Inferno, in which a star-studded cast endures melodramatic story lines as the audience awaits the inevitable momentous event and tries to guess who will be around at the finish ... It's easy to become swept up in the palpable enthusiasm Estevez shows toward his subject, but the pedestrian and overly expositional dialogue of the film's characters proves to be as stifling as the excerpts from Kennedy's speeches are stirring."

Deborah Young of Variety said of Estevez, "Stepping up as writer and director in a way he never has before, [he] successfully pulls together a complexly designed narrative", and added the film "carries an eerie topicality that makes many of its insights instantly click." Armond White of New York Press wrote that the film "has a humane sweetness", and that it "literally and vividly unites different ethnic groups, labor strata and social castes" in a way that "is not schematic—its exactitude and believability has a Tocquevillian brilliance."

Steve Persall of the St. Petersburg Times graded the film C, calling it "a misguided jumble of too much fiction, few facts and zero speculation" and Estevez "a mediocre filmmaker". Michael Medved, who was in the Ambassador ballroom (20 feet from the podium) the night Kennedy was shot, awarded the film three out of four stars and called it "intriguing but imperfect". He added, "Emilio Estevez gets most of the feelings of the occasion right. But, the melodramatic, multi-character format proves somewhat uneven and distracting."

Richard Roeper said, "Estevez writes and directs with lots of passion, not so much subtlety ... [He] wants the movie to be on the level of a Robert Altman film like Nashville but falls short." Peter Travers of Rolling Stone gave the film one star and called it "trite fiction" and a work of "insipid ineptitude". He ranked it among the worst films of 2006, as did Lou Lumerick of the New York Post, who dubbed it an "ambitious, but utterly wrong-headed trivialization."

Awards and nominations

See also
 JFK, a 1991 film by Oliver Stone detailing the assassination of Robert F. Kennedy's brother, President John F. Kennedy.
 Parkland, a 2014 film commemorating the 50th anniversary of the JFK assassination.

References

External links
 
 
 
 
 

2006 films
2000s political drama films
American political drama films
Spanish-language American films
Films about assassinations
Films about race and ethnicity
Films about Robert F. Kennedy
Drama films based on actual events
Films set in Los Angeles
Films set in hotels
Films set in 1968
Films shot in California
Films shot in Los Angeles
Works about the Robert F. Kennedy assassination
Cultural depictions of Robert F. Kennedy
Bold Films films
Films directed by Emilio Estevez
Films scored by Mark Isham
2006 drama films
Metro-Goldwyn-Mayer films
The Weinstein Company films
2000s English-language films
2000s American films